Joni Yli-Torkko (born April 14, 1982) is a Finnish former professional ice hockey forward who last played with SaiPa in the SM-liiga.

He has not played a game since the 2009–10 season due to a severe groin injury.

References

External links

1982 births
Living people
Finnish ice hockey right wingers
Imatran Ketterä players
Lukko players
SaiPa players
HC TPS players
People from Lappeenranta
Sportspeople from South Karelia